= Kadyie =

Town of ancient Ionia

Coordinates: 37°49′56″N 27°34′07″E

Kadyie was a town of ancient Ionia.

Its site is near Üzümlü, Asiatic Turkey.
